Events from the year 1971 in Denmark.

Incumbents
 Monarch – Frederick IX
 Prime minister – Jens Otto Krag

Events

Sports
 10 September – Ole Olsen wins the 1971 Individual Speedway World Championship.

Births
12 January - Peter Madsen, convicted murderer, former engineer and entrepreneur
18 February - Thomas Bjørn, professional golfer
5 May - Helene Kirkegaard, badminton player
5 June - Eske Willerslev, evolutionary geneticist

Deaths
 24 March – Arne Jacobsen, architect, furniture designer (born 1902)
 1 May – Ejnar Mikkelsen, Polar explorer and author (born 1880)

See also
1971 in Danish television

References

 
Denmark
Years of the 20th century in Denmark
1970s in Denmark